Stoyan Ganev (Bulgarian: Стоян Ганев; July 23, 1955 – July 1, 2013) was a UN official, Bulgarian diplomat (foreign minister), politician (Union of Democratic Forces) and jurist.

Early life
Ganev was born in Pazardzhik. He graduated from the high school in mathematics (1973) and studied at the Faculty of law in the Sofia University (1979). He defended a thesis on constitutional law at the Moscow State University (1985).

Political career:
 President of the United Nations General Assembly (1992 - 1993)
 Foreign minister of Bulgaria (November 8, 1991 – December 30, 1992)
 Deputy prime minister of Bulgaria (November 8, 1991 – May 20, 1992)
 Member of the Bulgarian Parliament from UDF (1990 - 1991, 1992 - 1993)
 President of the United Christian Democratic Union (former UDC, October 18, 1992 - May 16, 1993)
 Co-president of the United Democratic Center (UDC, April - July, 1990)

Lecturer:
 Sofia University, in Constitutional Law (1979 - 1989)
 G. Dimitrov Higher Special Institut (now Academy of the Ministry of Interior)
 Konrad Adenauer Foundation in Germany, in International politics and law
 Rotary International, in International politics and law
 University of Bridgeport
 New York University

Awards:
 Gold medal for peace for his contributions to the preservation of peace and security on the planet, the UN (1992)
 Great honorable Cross, the Association for the unity of Latin America (1992)

Death
Ganev died at the aged 57 on July 1, 2013 in Greenwich, Connecticut, United States.

See also

List of foreign ministers in 1992 
 Foreign relations of Bulgaria
List of Bulgarians

References

External links

 

 

1955 births
2013 deaths
People from Pazardzhik
Union of Democratic Forces (Bulgaria) politicians
Deputy prime ministers of Bulgaria
Foreign ministers of Bulgaria
Bulgarian diplomats
Presidents of the United Nations General Assembly
Bulgarian emigrants to the United States